Diana Bellessi (born 1946) is an Argentine poet.

Life
Diana Bellessi was born in 1946, in Zavalla, Santa Fe, Argentina.
She studied philosophy at the Universidad Nacional del Litoral
From 1969 to 1975, she walked the continent.  
For two years, she coordinated writing workshops in prisons in Buenos Aires. She embodied this experience in the book Contraband Paloma (Torres Aguero, Buenos Aires, 1988).

In March 2008, she participated in the Fourth International Festival of Izmir, dedicated to Latin America, with Sergio Badilla Castillo, María Baranda, Rei Berroa, Rafael Courtoisie, Pablo Armando Fernández, and Margarita Laso.

She lives in Buenos Aires.

Awards
 1993 Guggenheim Fellowship in poetry
 1996 Antorchas Foundation fellowship
 2004 Premio Konex, Merit Award
 2007 Fondo Nacional de las Artes, lifetime award in poetry

Works
 Destino y propagaciones, Edit. Casa de la Cultura Ecuatoriana, Núcleo del Guayas, 1972
 Crucero ecuatorial, Ediciones Sirirí, 1980
 Tributo del mudo, Ediciones Sirirí, 1982
 Danzante de doble máscara, 1985
 Eroica, Libros de Tierra Firme/Ediciones Ultimo Reino, 1988
 Buena travesía, buena ventura pequeña Uli, 1991
 El Jardín, Bajo la Luna Nueva, 1992, 
 Crucero Ecuatorial / Tributo del Mudo, 1994
 The Twins, the Dream (with Ursula K. Le Guin), Arte Publico Press, 1996, 
 Sur, Libros de Tierra Firme, 1998
 Gemelas del sueño (con U.K. Le Guin), 1998
 Mate cocido, Grupo Editor Latinoamericano, 2002, 
 La Edad Dorada, Adriana Hidalgo Editora, 2003, 
 La rebelión del Instante, Adriana Hidalgo Editora, 2005, 
 Variaciones de la luz, Bajo la Luna, 2006, 
 Tener lo que se tiene - Poesía reunida, 2009
"Gender and Translation", Voice-overs: translation and Latin American literature, Editors Daniel Balderston, Marcy E. Schwartz, SUNY Press, 2002, 
Las Malas lenguas: antología del cancionero tradicional picaresco, Editors Diana Bellessi, Noemí Diez, Ediciones Del Sol, 1992, 
A palavra nômade: poesia argentina dos anos 70, Editor Santiago Kovadloff, Iluminuras Ltda, 1990,

References

Sources
"Un lugar celebratario para la escritura: Diana Bellessi", La doble voz, Alicia Genovese, Editorial Biblos, 1998,

External links
“La poesía es la cabecita negra de la literatura”, Pagina 12, 23 March 2009
"Dossier Diana Bellessi " , Cyber Humanitatis N° 24, Spring 2002, Facultad de Filosofía y Humanidades, Universidad de Chile ISSN 0717-2869

1946 births
Living people
Argentine poets
Argentine women poets